The Alfonse M. D'Amato United States Courthouse is a federal courthouse for the United States District Court for the Eastern District of New York. It is located at 100 Federal Plaza in Central Islip on Long Island in New York.  It is named after former U.S. Senator Al D'Amato of New York, a native of Long Island.

Architecture
The courthouse was designed by Richard Meier. It opened in 2000 and is the third largest federal courthouse in the United States (after the Thomas F. Eagleton United States Courthouse and Daniel Patrick Moynihan United States Courthouse) and the largest building on Long Island outside of New York City. The 12-story building contains , 23 courtrooms and 24 judge's chambers, as well as a law library.  Its main entrance is via its signature conical drum. Courtrooms have two-story high ceilings, and the upper floor hallways have expansive views of the Great South Bay, Fire Island and the Atlantic Ocean.

The courthouse is one of the buildings constructed on the grounds of the former  Central Islip Psychiatric Center, which was decommissioned in 1996 after its last remaining patients were relocated.  Other structures on the former hospital's grounds include the New York Institute of Technology, Fairfield Properties Ballpark (home to the Long Island Ducks), Islip Town Fire Museum, Touro Law School and the Cohalan County Court Complex for Suffolk County.

Use
The other courthouse for the Eastern District of New York is the Theodore Roosevelt Federal Courthouse in downtown Brooklyn.  This building is the first federal courthouse on Long Island outside of New York City.  It replaced six leased locations in Nassau and Suffolk counties. Since June 2015, the building has also been the location of the Long Island Office of Disability Adjudication and Review, which handles appeals of Social Security Administration determinations.

The Gallery of Shorthand is located in the building's lobby immediately inside the main entrance. The educational exhibit traces the development of shorthand, stenography and court reporting from ancient times to the present in many parts of the world.  On display are examples of shorthand from the ancient Middle East and China, as well as books about stenographic techniques from various countries and numerous stenotype machines from different periods and for different languages.

Naming
D'Amato had sponsored legislation to build the courthouse and it was originally named the Long Island U.S. Courthouse.  It was renamed for D'Amato in 2002 under a bill introduced by Representative Peter T. King which was supported in the Senate by Chuck Schumer, who had defeated D'Amato for re-election and succeeded him as senator.  The renaming was controversial because D'Amato is still alive.

References

Courthouses in New York (state)
Federal courthouses in the United States
Islip (town), New York
Richard Meier buildings
Buildings and structures in Suffolk County, New York